Richard Lee Washington (born July 15, 1955) is an American former professional basketball player.

Early life
A 6'11" center born in Portland, Oregon, Washington played high school ball at Portland's Benson Tech. An all-around athlete and agile big man, Washington was a three-time all-state and first-team all-tournament selection and led Benson to state championships in 1971 and 1973. Benson was a combined 77-6 those three seasons. Washington was also a hurdler in track and, as a defensive end-receiver, was MVP on the Techmen football team his junior year (the last year he played football).

College career
Washington was highly recruited out of high school and seriously considered the University of Hawaii, but he decided to play college basketball for perennial national champion UCLA and legendary coach John Wooden. In his three seasons at UCLA, the Bruins went 26-4, 28-3 and 28-4, won three Pac-8 championships and made three Final Fours.

In Washington's sophomore season of 1974–75, the Bruins captured the NCAA title. The Bruins went 28-3 and, powered by the front line of future NBA players Washington, Dave Meyers and Marques Johnson, and defeated Kentucky 92-85 in the title game, which would also be coach Wooden's final game. Washington was named NCAA basketball tournament Most Outstanding Player following UCLA's 1975 championship.

He earned first-team All-American honors as a junior in 1975–76.

College statistics

|-
| align="left" | 1973–74
| align="left" | UCLA
| 24 || - || - || .513 || - || .500 || 2.8 || 0.5 || - || - || 4.1
|-
| align="left" | 1974–75
| align="left" | UCLA
| 31 || - || - || .576 || - || .724 || 7.8 || 2.2 || - || - || 15.9
|-
| align="left" | 1975–76
| align="left" | UCLA
| 32 || - || - || .513 || - || .736 || 8.6 || 3.1 || - || - || 20.1
|- class="sortbottom"
| style="text-align:center;" colspan="2"| Career
| 87 || - || - || .536 || - || .702 || 6.7 || 2.0 || - || - || 14.2
|}

NBA career
Washington was declared eligible for the 1976 NBA draft due to hardship status. He played six seasons in the NBA as a member of the Kansas City Kings, Milwaukee Bucks, Dallas Mavericks and Cleveland Cavaliers. In his NBA career, he scored 3,456 points and grabbed 2,204 rebounds.

NBA career statistics

Regular season

|-
| align="left" | 1976–77
| align="left" | Kansas City
| 82 || - || 27.6 || .431 || - || .697 || 8.5 || 1.0 || 0.8 || 1.1 || 13.0
|-
| align="left" | 1977–78
| align="left" | Kansas City
| 78 || - || 28.6 || .477 || - || .754 || 8.4 || 1.5 || 0.9 || 0.9 || 12.8
|-
| align="left" | 1978–79
| align="left" | Kansas City
| 18 || - || 8.9 || .341 || - || .625 || 2.7 || 0.4 || 0.4 || 0.2 || 2.1
|-
| align="left" | 1979–80
| align="left" | Milwaukee
| 75 || - || 14.6 || .468 || .000 || .605 || 3.7 || 0.7 || 0.3 || 0.6 || 5.9
|-
| align="left" | 1980–81
| align="left" | Dallas
| 11 || - || 27.9 || .436 || .000 || .739 || 7.6 || 1.5 || 0.5 || 0.6 || 10.8
|-
| align="left" | 1980–81
| align="left" | Cleveland
| 69 || - || 21.8 || .459 || .500 || .750 || 5.3 || 1.6 || 0.6 || 0.8 || 9.9
|-
| align="left" | 1981–82
| align="left" | Cleveland
| 18 || 2 || 17.4 || .435 || .000 || .600 || 4.2 || 0.8 || 0.4 || 0.1 || 6.1
|- class="sortbottom"
| style="text-align:center;" colspan="2"| Career
| 351 || 2 || 22.4 || .453 || .250 || .711 || 6.3 || 1.2 || 0.6 || 0.8 || 9.8
|}

Playoffs

|-
| align="left" | 1978–79
| align="left" | Kansas City
| 4 || - || 13.0 || .550 || - || 1.000 || 3.3 || 0.0 || 0.3 || 0.3 || 6.0
|-
| align="left" | 1979–80
| align="left" | Milwaukee
| 7 || - || 16.0 || .532 || .000 || .250 || 2.9 || 0.4 || 0.6 || 1.1 || 7.3
|- class="sortbottom"
| style="text-align:center;" colspan="2"| Career
| 11 || - || 14.9 || .537 || .000 || .500 || 3.0 || 0.3 || 0.5 || 0.8 || 6.8
|}

Personal life
Washington and his wife, Leiko, reside in Milwaukie, Oregon. They have raised two daughters. Interested in building and construction since his youth, in 1993 he founded Richard Washington Construction, a general contracting company.

In 1988, Washington was inducted into the Oregon Sports Hall of Fame.

References

External links
Career statistics
UCLA 1975 championship team
College Stats

1955 births
Living people
20th-century African-American sportspeople
21st-century African-American people
African-American basketball players
All-American college men's basketball players
American men's basketball players
Basketball players from Portland, Oregon
Benson Polytechnic High School alumni
Centers (basketball)
Cleveland Cavaliers players
Dallas Mavericks expansion draft picks
Dallas Mavericks players
Kansas City Kings draft picks
Kansas City Kings players
Milwaukee Bucks players
Parade High School All-Americans (boys' basketball)
UCLA Bruins men's basketball players